Garfein is a surname. Notable people with the surname include:

Herschel Garfein (born 1958), American composer, librettist, and stage director
Jack Garfein (1930–2019), Czech film director and producer
Rebecca Garfein, American hazzan